Guitar Music is the debut studio album from British band Courting. It was released on 23 September 2022 by PIAS Recordings.

Style and composition 
The album has been described as a fusion genre between art punk, post-punk, and hyperpop.

Release and promotion 
Songwriting took place in 2021, and recording took place in late 2021 into early 2022. The album was produced by James Dring.

Singles 
Guitar Music had three singles that were released ahead of the album in promotion of the release. The lead-off single, "Tennis", was released on 5 April 2022. The single was described by NME as tongue-in-cheek, and playful. The band described "Tennis" as "“a paypig’s personal redemption narrative, set in "the city", and told in two parts: A twisted tale of two lovers' back and forth, bound by cricket, bodybuilding and money. A story as old as time". Far Out Magazine dismissed the single as "derivative", and gave it a 5.8 out of 10. The second single, "Loaded", was released on 25 May 2022.

"Jumper" is the third and final single before the album was released. The single, released on 16 August 2022. In an interview with DIY, the band described the song as "an outlier on the album". Sean Murphy-O’Neil further said of the album that it "is a gentle story of true unrequited love, meant to playout like a 2006 romcom. It is about growing old and believing everything will fall into place, the mundanity of doing dishes, and leaving oppositional film reviews.

Track listing

Critical reception 

Guitar Music was well-received by contemporary music critics. On review aggregator website, Metacritic, Guitar Music has an average critic rating of 79 out 100 indicating "generally favorable reviews".

Personnel 
Band
 Sean Murphy-O'Neill
 Sean Thomas
 Joshua Cope
 Connor McCann
Production, artwork, and mastering

 Alex Bex — Photography
 Nathan Chinn — Assistant Engineer
 Matt Colton — Mastering
 James Dring — Mixing, Producer
 Holly Minto — Trumpet
 Claudius Mittendorfer — Mixing
 Charlie Puth — Photography
 Thomas Harrington Rawle — Artwork
 Kieran Shudall — Composer
 Grant Watling — Assistant Engineer
 Charles Watson — Background Vocals
 Robert Whiteley — Engineer

References 

2022 debut albums
Courting (band) albums
PIAS Recordings albums